DSO may refer to:

Organisations
 Defence Science Organisation, now known as DSO National Laboratories, Singapore
 Defense Sciences Office, part of the US Defense Advanced Research Projects Agency
 Directorate of Special Operations, a South African law-enforcement agency
 Direct service organisation, a business unit of a United Kingdom local authority
 Groupe DSO, an Australian headquartered business cooperative

Orchestras
 Dallas Symphony Orchestra
 Denver Symphony Orchestra
 Detroit Symphony Orchestra
 Diablo Swing Orchestra
 Dubuque Symphony Orchestra, in Dubuque, Iowa
 Darwin Symphony Orchestra, in Darwin, Northern Territory, Australia
 Deutsches Symphonie-Orchester Berlin, in Berlin, Germany
 Dubrovnik Symphony Orchestra, in Dubrovnik, Croatia
 Dark Star Orchestra, in Chicago, Illinois, United States

Technology
 Digital Sampling Oscilloscope, samples measurements and displays or stores them
 Digital storage oscilloscope, which stores and analyses the signal digitally
 Direct Sparse Odometry, a machine vision algorithm for Simultaneous localization and mapping
 Dynamic Shared Object, in computing
 Drakensang Online, the online computer game

Astronomy
 Dark Sky Observatory, Appalachian State University (ASU)
 Deep-sky object, in astronomy

Other uses
 Distinguished Service Order (disambiguation), several decorations
 Dark Star Orchestra, a Grateful Dead cover band formed in Chicago, Illinois
 Diablo Swing Orchestra, a Swedish avant-garde metal band
 Digital switchover
 Dental Service Organizations
 Days sales outstanding, in accountancy
 Direct Shipping Ore, iron ore that can be shipped directly to a steel furnace 
 Distribution System Operators, in energy systems
 Diving safety officer, an administrator of United States university's research diving safety program
 Defensive Systems Operator, a member of the flight crew responsible for defensive systems
 Dubai Silicon Oasis, a free-trade zone in Dubai
 Dobbertin Surface Orbiter, an amphibious vehicle
 Domestic Security Officer serving as riot police
 Sondok Airport, IATA airport code